On the Good Ship Enterprise: My 15 Years with Star Trek is a book written by Bjo Trimble.

Contents
On the Good Ship Enterprise is a book of anecdotes and trivia about Star Trek.

Reception
Dave Langford reviewed On the Good Ship Enterprise for White Dwarf #41, and stated that "the book froths with too much uncritical enthusiasm and too much exclamation marks for comfortable reading."

Reviews
Review by Steve Miller (1983) in Science Fiction Review, Summer 1983 
Review by Robert Coulson (1983) in Amazing Stories, September 1983

References

1983 books
Books about Star Trek